Mainstone is a civil parish in Shropshire, England.  It contains nine listed buildings that are recorded in the National Heritage List for England.  Of these, one is at Grade II*, the middle of the three grades, and the others are at Grade II, the lowest grade.  The parish contains the small village of Mainstone and the surrounding countryside, and the listed buildings are scattered around the parish.  Most of them are farmhouses and farm buildings, and the other listed buildings are a house, a church, and a memorial in the churchyard.
 

Key

Buildings

References

Citations

Sources

Lists of buildings and structures in Shropshire